William Pasteur  (1855–1943) was a British physician and pioneer of pulmonology.

Biography
After education at the cram school Philberds, Maidenhead, and at University College, London, William Pasteur qualified MRCS in 1880 from University College Hospital and became a house physician there. He graduated M.B. (Lond.) in 1882. After postgraduate study at Vienna clinics, he graduated MD in 1884.

He was elected FRCP in 1891. He gave the Bradshaw Lecture in 1908. On 15 May 1911 he delivered his presidential address to the Medical Society of London on post-operative lung complications. During WWI he served from 1914 to 1918, at the Rouen base with the temporary rank of Colonel, Army Medical Services, as consultant physician to the British Armies in France. His predecessor in that post was James Kingston Fowler. For his military service, Pasteur was mentioned in dispatches and was appointed CB in 1918 and CMG in 1919. WWI gave him many opportunities for studying gunshot wounds to the chest.

He was a member of the Athenaeum Club and the Alpine Club.

Family
William Pasteur's parents emigrated from Switzerland to England. In 1890 William Pasteur married Violet Mabel Seddon. They had two daughters and a son. Their son, William Raymond Pasteur, was born in 1896. He became a captain in the British Army, was killed in action on 10 July 1917 in West Flanders, and was awarded the Military Cross.

Atelectasis

The term atelectasis pulmonum was introduced in 1832 by the physician Eduard Jörg (1808–1878), whose father was Johann Christian Gottfried Jörg (1779–1856), Leipzig professor of medicine, specializing in obstetrics, gynecology, and pediatrics. Clinical interest in atelectasis was stimulated by William Pasteur's presentation in 1890.

Selected publications
with Solomon Solis-Cohen:

References 

1855 births
1943 deaths
British pulmonologists
20th-century British medical doctors
Alumni of University College London
Alumni of the London Hospital Medical College
Fellows of the Royal College of Physicians
Physicians of the Middlesex Hospital
Companions of the Order of St Michael and St George
Companions of the Order of the Bath
Royal Army Medical Corps officers